The Aliw Theater is an events venue in Pasay, Metro Manila, Philippines. It is located in the Cultural Center of the Philippines Complex, adjacent to the Star City amusement park and the Manila Broadcasting Company.

History
The Aliw Theater was built in 2002 as a gift of businessman Fred J. Elizalde to his ballerina wife, Lisa Macuja-Elizalde. The theater was personally designed by Fred Elizalde and is owned by Star Parks Corporation, which is also the owners and developers of the adjacent Star City amusement park.

The theater's seating and stage survived a major fire on October 2, 2019, which affected the Star City amusement park compound.

On August 10, 2022, Aliw Theater reopened with newly refurbished seats and stage design, followed by the accompanied performances by Ballet Manila. In November 2022, The Feast Bay Area, a weekly gathering of the Light of Jesus Family founded by Bro. Bo Sanchez, was transferred from the Philippine International Convention Center to Aliw Theater, marking its return to the latter after several years.

Features
The Aliw Theater is situated on an area spanning . Other events facilities hosted within the theater building are the  Aliw Theater Lounge and the  Elizalde Hall (Aliw Theater Hall). The seating capacity of the theater is 1,275, which was less than the previous capacity of 2,358. For events that require the presence of an orchestra, 200 more seats would have to be reduced to accommodate the band.

A 100-capacity orchestra pit is also present within the theater which is the largest in the Philippines. Like the theater itself, the feature which was unveiled in October 2012 was a present to Lisa Macuja-Elizalde whose birthday is on October 3.

Radio stations owned by the Manila Broadcasting Company namely DZRH, DZMB (Love Radio), DWRK (Easy Rock), DWYS (Yes The Best) and Radyo Natin Nationwide are also hosted on the theater's first floor where the entrance is also situated.

References

Buildings and structures in Pasay
Theaters and concert halls in Metro Manila
Theatres completed in 2002